The 1994 Campionati Internazionali di Sicilia was a men's tennis tournament played on outdoor clay courts in Palermo, Italy that was part of the World Series of the 1994 ATP Tour. It was the 16th edition of the tournament and took place from 26 September until 2 October 1994. First-seeded Alberto Berasategui won the singles title.

Finals

Singles
 Alberto Berasategui defeated  Àlex Corretja 2–6, 7–6(8–6), 6–4
 It was Berasategui's 4th singles title of the year and the 5th of his career.

Doubles
 Tom Kempers /  Jack Waite defeated  Neil Broad /  Greg Van Emburgh 6–7, 6–4, 6–3

References

External links
 ITF – tournament edition details

Campionati Internazionali di Sicilia
Campionati Internazionali di Sicilia
Campionati Internazionali di Sicilia